Chaetopelma altugkadirorum is a small, Old World tarantula. This species is found in the Eastern Mediterranean, in border area of Turkey and Syria. The species closely resembles Chaetopelma olivaceum a widespread species in the region. It was first described by British arachnologists Richard C. Gallon, Ray Gabriel, and Guy Tansley in 2012. With the description of this new species the genus Chaetopelma now comprises five species.

Habitat 
Chaetopelma altugkadirorum is found within burrows (up to 50 cm in depth) in light pine forest of Yayladağı district of Hatay Province of Turkey and Ras al-Bassit of Syria. Burrows were often observed in association with rotten pine stumps, with the burrow excavated along the decaying remains of the stump’s root system.

Naming 
The epithet altugkadirorum a patronym honouring both Turkish arachnologists Altuğ Kızıltuğ and Kadir Boğaç Kunt, whose efforts were instrumental in securing material of this species for description.

References

External links 
The Chaetopelma altugkadirorum video on the YouTube

Theraphosidae
Spiders of Asia
Spiders described in 2012